Lee Wai Lim (born 5 May 1981) is a former Hong Kong professional football player and coach. He is the brother of current Lee Man player Lee Hong Lim.

A former Hong Kong Footballer of the Year winner in 2009, Lee pleaded guilty in 2018 to one count each of accepting an advantage and conspiracy to defraud. He was sentenced to 180 hours of community service for his crimes.

Club career

Tai Po
Lee joined Tai Po in the third division in 2003 after being discovered by Tai Po's secretary Chan Ping. He stayed with the team as it progressed to the First Division in 2007 and turned professional. During his time as an amateur, he worked as a shopping mall security guard.

2009 Hong Kong FA Cup
Lee scored the penalty against Fourway to take Tai Po to the final of the Hong Kong FA Cup.

In the final, Lee Wai Lim scored a free kick and helped Tai Po beat TSW Pegasus 4:2 and thus became the first district team to win the trophy. Lee Wai Lim also won the title of Man of the Match.

His last match for Tai Po FC was a friendly against his new employers South China on 13 June 2009 at Mong Kok Stadium. Tai Po lost the game. Lee Wai Lim scored a penalty which he won himself.

Lee was awarded Hong Kong Player of the Year award on 12 June 2009 and received a HK$45,000 prize.

South China
On the same date he won the Player of the Year prize, Lee Wai Lim confirmed that he would be joining South China in the season of 2009–10.

On 11 May 2010, in the 2010 AFC Cup second round match against Al Riffa, in the 28th minute, Lee Wai Lim passed to teammate Lee Chi Ho to score. But South China lost the game 1:3.

On 19 February 2011, Lee scored with a header in the 82-minute to help South China win the away game by 1:0 against Tuen Mun.

Pegasus
Lee joined Pegasus in the summer of 2015 as a player-coach.

International career
He was selected by Goran Paulić and Dejan Antonić for the Hong Kong team at the end of 2008, to prepare for the 2011 AFC Asian Cup qualifiers. He scored a hattrick in his first game against Macau as Hong Kong achieved a 9–1 win.

He starred in the 2009 Guangdong-Hong Kong Cup, scoring one goal and providing two assists to help Hong Kong secure a 4–1 victory at home and a 5–4 aggregate win over Guangdong. His performance earned him the nickname Prince William from the fans.

On 30 September 2011, Lee Wai Lim scored the opening goal in the 3:3 draw with the Philippines in the 2011 Long Teng Cup.

Bribery scandal
On 6 October 2016, Lee was one of six current and former Pegasus players to be taken in for questioning by the ICAC on allegations of match fixing. He was formally charged on 28 June 2017 for conspiring to fix several reserve league matches.

On 12 January 2018, Lee pleaded guilty to one count each of accepting an advantage and conspiracy to defraud. He was sentenced on 4 May 2018 to 180 hours of community service.

Career Statistics

Club
As of 10 October 2012

International
 As of 15 October 2013.

Personal life
He is the elder brother of Lee Hong Lim, who used to be his team mate at Tai Po, until he moved in January 2009 to Pegasus.

Honours

Club
Tai Po
Hong Kong FA Cup: 2008–09

South China
Hong Kong First Division: 2009–10
Hong Kong Senior Shield: 2009–10

International
Hong Kong
Guangdong-Hong Kong Cup: 2009, 2013

Individual
Hong Kong Footballer of the Year: 2009

References

External links
 Tai Po FC Player profile
 Hong Kong Football Association player profile
 Hong Kong National Team player profile

1981 births
Living people
Hong Kong footballers
Hong Kong First Division League players
Hong Kong Premier League players
Association football wingers
Tai Po FC players
South China AA players
TSW Pegasus FC players
Hong Kong international footballers
Hong Kong people of Hakka descent
Indigenous inhabitants of the New Territories in Hong Kong